The first season of Alyas Robin Hood, a Philippine television drama series on GMA Network, premiered on September 19, 2016 and concluded on February 24, 2017, with a total of 115 episodes. It was replaced by Destined to be Yours in its timeslot.

Plot 
After being estranged from his family for some years, Pepe De Jesus (Dingdong Dantes) returns home to make amends with his parents, Jose (Christopher de Leon) and Judy (Jaclyn Jose). Pepe grew up someone who tends to start fights much to the dismay of his father who hates conflicts. He revealed to his family that he has changed his ways and is becoming a lawyer soon and was welcomed by his family including his father who was initially unhappy of his return. Pepe also gets to know a girl, a pediatrician named Sarri Acosta (Megan Young).

All seems well for the De Jesus family until Pepe found his father dead apparently murdered by his own arrow which Pepe owned since he was a teenager. He seeks who was behind for the murder but he was blamed for the death of his own father and was convicted of a crime he didn't commit. While in transit to his prison, the vehicle carrying Pepe was bombed and Pepe along with the vehicle fell from a bridge. He was later found by Venus, (Andrea Torres) who taught him martial arts.
 
Everyone thought that Pepe is dead. Armed with a bow and arrow made by his best friend, Jekjek (Gio Alvarez), Pepe takes advantage of the situation to find who really was behind the murder of his father under a secret identity. He will also have the opportunity to thwart the illegal operations of those he suspects to be behind his father's murders and the money earned from these illegal operations are redistributed to the people in need which caused him to be known as "Alyas Robin Hood", an alter ego he adopts while he clears his own name.

Cast and characters

Main cast
Dingdong Dantes as Jose Paulo "Pepe" de Jesus Jr./Alyas Robin Hood/Crisostomo "Cris" Bonifacio
Megan Young as Sarri Acosta
Andrea Torres as Venus Ocampo/Clara Bonifacio

Supporting cast
Sid Lucero as Dean Balbuena
Jaclyn Jose as Judy de Jesus
Cherie Gil as Margarita "Maggie" Balbuena
Lindsay De Vera as Lizzy de Jesus/Sakura
Dave Bornea as Julian Balbuena
Gary Estrada as Carlos "Caloy" de Jesus
Dennis Padilla as Wilson Chan
Gio Alvarez as Jericho "Jekjek" Sumilang
Paolo Contis as SPO2 Daniel Acosta
Rey "PJ" Abellana as Leandro Ocampo
Ces Quesada as Mayor Anita "Cha" Escano
Antonette Garcia as Frida Estanislao-Aguilar
Luri Vincent Nalus as Junior "Junjun" Aguilar
Erlinda Villalobos as Julia "Huling" Sumilang
Caprice Cayetano as Ecai Sumilang
Rob Moya as SPO4 Oli Cruz
Maritess Joaquin as Donya Victoria Acosta
Michael Flores as Jorel and Llama
Anthony Falcon as Chino
Jade Lopez as Chef Pop/Ariana Grenade
Prince Villanueva as Rex
Pauline Mendoza as Betchay
John Feir as Armando Estanislao

Special participation
Christopher de Leon as Jose de Jesus Sr.

Guest cast
Julius Escarga as young Pepe
Arjan Jimenez as young Caloy
Will Ashley De Leon as young Jekjek
Charles Jacob Briz as young Jojo
Vic Trio as Tomas Mayuga
Jay Arcilla as Louie Mayuga
Tanya Gomez as Chairman Adelita Mayuga
Sue Prado as Cynthia de Jesus
Joko Diaz as Mayor Ramon Arguelles
James Teng as Miggy Arguelles
Ryza Cenon as Nancy Benitez
Marnie Lapuz as Maria Benitez
Dina Bonnevie as Mama Daisy
Liezel Lopez as Miaka
Marlann Flores as Honey
Lucho Ayala as Councilor Paras
Leanne Bautista as Angela
Cathy Remperas as Rose
Diva Montelaba as Maya
Joross Gamboa as Jojo
Tammy Brown as Ariana
Jenny Catchong as Beyonce
Crissy Marie Rendon as Rihanna
Aaron Yanga as Ipe

Episodes

References

2016 Philippine television seasons
2017 Philippine television seasons